Lješ is a Serbian masculine given name, a diminutive of Aleksa and may refer to:

Geography
Lješanska nahija, historical region in Montenegro
Lezhë, town in Albania, known in Serbian as Lješ

People
Aleksa Đurašević, known as Lješ, nobleman in Zeta

See also
Lje, a letter of the Cyrillic script
Lješevo, village in Bosnia and Herzegovina
Lješnica (disambiguation)
Lještansko, village in Serbia
Lješljani, village in Bosnia and Herzegovina

Serbian masculine given names